Arnotts can refer to;

 Arnott's Biscuits, an Australian biscuit and salted snack food company
 Arnotts (Ireland), a department store in Dublin, Ireland
 Arnotts (Scotland) a department store in Glasgow and group of department stores in Scotland. A trading name of House of Fraser which is no longer in use.